Jessica Castleberry is an American politician and businesswoman serving as a member of the South Dakota Senate from District 35. She was appointed to the senate by Governor Kristi Noem to replace Lynne DiSanto on December 31, 2019.
Castleberry was born and raised in Rapid City, South Dakota, where she operates preschools and has served on the Rapid City Area Schools Strategic Planning Committee.

References 

Year of birth missing (living people)
Living people
Politicians from Rapid City, South Dakota
Republican Party South Dakota state senators
Women state legislators in South Dakota
21st-century American politicians
21st-century American women politicians